Episcepsis redunda is a moth of the family Erebidae. It was described by William Schaus in 1910. It is found in Mexico, Costa Rica, Trinidad, Venezuela, French Guiana, Guyana and Peru.

References

Euchromiina
Moths described in 1910